El Ingenio District is one of five districts of the province Nasca in Peru.

References

1917 establishments in Peru